Calvin Johannes Poulina (born 23 November 1999) is a Dutch basketball player, who currently plays for the Bethune Cookman University men's basketball team.

Early career
While also playing for the youth teams of ZZ Leiden, Poulina made his debut with the professional team of the club in the 2015–16 season at age 16. In the 2016–17 season, he played in nine Dutch Basketball League (DBL) games with the team and averaged 2.6 minutes.

For the 2017–18 season, he left for Czech club Get Better Academy (GBA), which plays in the 1.Liga, the Czech second-level league.

College career
In June 2018, Poulina committed to the Binghamton Bearcats men's basketball team.

National team career
Poulina played with the Netherlands under-16 national basketball team at the 2017 FIBA Europe Under-16 Championship.

References

1999 births
Dutch men's basketball players
Binghamton Bearcats men's basketball players
B.S. Leiden players
Dutch Basketball League players
Living people
Forwards (basketball)